Šenov is a town in Ostrava-City District in the Moravian-Silesian Region of the Czech Republic. It has about 6,500 inhabitants. It lies in the historical region of Cieszyn Silesia.

Geography
Šenov lies in the Ostrava Basin lowland. It is located on the Lučina River.

History
Šenov was probably founded in around 1290. The creation of the village was a part of a larger settlement campaign taking place in the late 13th century on the territory of what will be later known as Upper Silesia. The first written mention is in a Latin document of Diocese of Wrocław called Liber fundationis episcopatus Vratislaviensis from 1305 under its Latin name Sonow.

Politically the village belonged initially to the Duchy of Teschen, formed in 1290 in the process of feudal fragmentation of Poland and was ruled by a local branch of Piast dynasty. In 1327 the duchy became a fee of Kingdom of Bohemia, which after 1526 became part of the Habsburg monarchy.

The village could have become a seat of a Catholic parish if Schonwald mentioned in a register of Peter's Pence payment from 1447 among 50 parishes of Teschen deaconry was a temporary but similar name for the village at that time. After the 1540s Protestant Reformation prevailed in the Duchy of Teschen and a local Catholic church was taken over by Lutherans. It was taken from them (as one from around fifty buildings in the region) by a special commission and given back to the Roman Catholic Church on 25 March 1654.

In around 1576, Šenov was acquired by the noble family of Skrbenský of Hříště. Šenov was in their possession for almost 300 years. The family had built here a magnificent renaissance castle, which stood in the area of today's park. It was demolished in 1927.

According to the Austrian census of 1910 the town had 3,441 inhabitants, 3,412 of whom had permanent residence there. Census asked people for their native language, 2,820 (82.6%) were Czech-speaking and 528 (15.5%) were Polish-speaking. Most populous religious groups were Roman Catholics with 2,883 (83.8%), followed by Protestants with 539 (15.7%).

Notable people
Wacław Olszak (1868–1939), Polish physician and politician
Vilém Wünsche (1900–1984), painter, graphic artist and illustrator

Twin towns – sister cities

Šenov is twinned with:
 Strumień, Poland

References

External links

 

Cities and towns in the Czech Republic
Populated places in Ostrava-City District
Cieszyn Silesia